Devil City Angels  is a rock supergroup formed by guitarist Tracii Guns (L.A. Guns), drummer Rikki Rockett (Poison), bassist Eric Brittingham (Cinderella) and vocalist and rhythm guitarist Brandon Gibbs (Cheap Thrill).

History

The new rock supergroup officially launched a website and posted some songs including their debut single "All My People"
 and "No Angels".

Following the recording of the band's debut album bassist Rudy Sarzo from Quiet Riot replaced Eric Brittingham and the band went on to release their debut music video for their single "Boneyard".

In July 2015, Devil City Angels released the single "All I Need" from their self-titled album which was produced by the band in Los Angeles and mixed in Nashville by Anthony Focx.

The self-titled debut album was officially released September 11, 2015. The album charted in Germany at #143.

In December 2015, Rockett announced that he had been battling throat cancer. In July 2016, he reported that he is now cancer-free. The band briefly went on tour in 2016.

In late 2016, with guitarist Tracii Guns booked with his L.A. Guns version for 2017 the band temporarily changed their name to Lords of Devil City featuring the return of Eric Brittingham and new guitarist Joel Kosche (ex-Collective Soul).  Lords of Devil City was short lived as the band re branded back to Devil City Angels in early 2017. In September 2017, Brittingham had been replaced by bassist Topher Nelson (John Corabi).

In 2020, Devil City Angels released the new single and official video "Testify".

Discography

Studio albums 
 Devil City Angels (2015)

Track listing
 Numb  
 All My People  
 Boneyard  
 I'm living  
 No Angels  
 Goodbye Forever  
 Ride with Me  
 All I Need  
 Back to the Drive  
 Bad Decisions

Singles 
 "All My People" (2014)
 "Boneyard" (2015)
 "All I Need" (2015)
 "Testify" (2020)

Members

Current
 Brandon Gibbs – lead vocals, rhythm guitar (2014–present)
 Rikki Rockett – drums, percussion (2014–present)
 Joel Kosche – lead guitar (2016-present)
 Topher Nelson – bass guitar (2017–present)

Former
 Tracii Guns – lead guitar (2014–2016)
 Eric Brittingham – bass guitar (2014–2015) and (2016-2017)
 Rudy Sarzo – bass guitar (2015–2016)

References 

American rock music groups
Musical groups established in 2014
2014 establishments in the United States